Titans of the Deep is a 1938 film inspired by the early 1930s deep-sea dives made by William Beebe and Otis Barton. Beebe and Barton were the first to set ocean depth records in a device invented by Barton.

The film was written by Les Adams. It was somewhat intended as a documentary but was often sold and advertised as an exploitation/horror picture.

Premise
Prominent scientists Dr. William Beebe and Otis Barton, using the Bathysphere invented by Barton, descend several thousand feet to the ocean floor off the shores of Bermuda to study and film sea creatures seen and filmed at that depth for the first time.

References
 Otis Barton, Adventure on land and under the sea, Longmans, London, (1954).
 Biography of Otis Barton on the website of the MIT School of Engineering

External links

1938 adventure films
1938 films
American black-and-white films
American documentary films
Documentary films about nature
Grand National Films films
1930s English-language films
1930s American films